Chile competed at the 2019 World Aquatics Championships in Gwangju, South Korea from 12 to 28 July.

Artistic swimming

Chile's artistic swimming team consisted of 2 athletes (2 female).

Women

Diving

Chile entered three divers.

Men

Women

Mixed

Swimming

Chile has entered three swimmers.

Men

Women

References

World Aquatics Championships
2019
Nations at the 2019 World Aquatics Championships